Federweisser (also Federweißer , from German Feder, "feather", and weiß, "white"; from the appearance of the suspended yeast, also known as Sturm, from German Sturm, storm in Austria), is an alcoholic beverage, typically 9% alcohol by volume, although versions of up to 13.5% alcohol by volume are not uncommon. (In contrast to all other alcoholic beverages, the alcohol content stated on a bottle of Federweisser is inconclusive, and presents an uppermost limit, not the actual content at any given time.) It is the product of fermented freshly pressed grape juice, known as must. The term in principle includes all stages of fermentation from must to finished wine.

(Note that, in Switzerland, this same term has a completely different meaning. There, Federweisser refers to a white wine made from red grapes, typically pinot noir.)

Fermentation 

Once yeast has been added, grapes begin to ferment rapidly. The sugar contained in the grapes is broken down into alcohol and carbon dioxide (glycolysis). As soon as an alcohol content of four percent has been reached, Federweißer may be sold. It continues to ferment until all the sugar has been broken down and an alcohol content of about ten percent has been reached.

As a beverage 

Due to the carbonation, Federweißer tastes quite refreshing, not unlike a light grape soda or a sweet sparkling wine. As fermentation progresses, however, Federweißer may increasingly assume a darker, often amber-like or light brown hue. In general, Federweißer is made from white grapes; when made from red grapes, the drink is called Federroter, Roter Sauser, or Roter Rauscher. Federroter is less common than Federweißer. Because of rapid fermentation, Federweißer can not be stored for long and should be consumed within a few days of purchase. As carbonic acid is constantly produced, the bottles can not be sealed airtight and have a permeable lid (they would burst otherwise). They must be stored in an upright position to allow the gas to continuously escape from the bottle and to prevent spilling.

Progressing fermentation was also a challenge in transporting bottled Federweisser over long distances before the advent of modern-day commercial traffic and refrigerated vehicles, the latter of which are needed to slow down the yeast's metabolism during transport. Therefore, in the old days, Federweisser was almost exclusively available (and, for the most part, known) in and around wine-growing regions.

Depending on the date of the grape harvest, it is available from early September to late October, and is generally served together with savoury food. The classic combination is Federweißer and Zwiebelkuchen, although Federweißer and chestnuts is also popular. . In the south-western part of Germany and neighboring Alsace, it is accompanied by Flammkuchen. ''''
 

Federweißer contains yeast, lactic acid bacteria, and a large amount of vitamin B1 and B2.

See also 

 Nouveau

References 

German wine
Wine styles